The Women's 58 kg competition at the 2017 World Weightlifting Championships was held on 30 November 2017.

Schedule

Medalists

Records

Results

References

External links
Results 

Women's 58 kg
2017 in women's weightlifting